Parker Maher (born July 12, 1993) is an American soccer player.

Career

College
Maher played his entire college soccer career at Missouri State University between 2011 and 2014. While at MSU, Maher earned All-MVC Second Team honors and was named MVC All-Tournament team and All-North/Central Region Academic First Team member.

Professional
Maher signed with USL club Saint Louis FC on February 13, 2015. He scored his first professional goal against the Charlotte Independence on July 4, 2015, and was named to the USL's Team of the Week for his performance.

Maher parted ways with Saint Louis FC on November 9, 2016. He later signed with Swope Park Rangers on November 30, 2016. Maher was released by Swope Park on December 3, 2018.

References

External links
MSU bio

1993 births
Living people
American soccer players
Saint Louis FC players
Sporting Kansas City II players
Association football defenders
Soccer players from Missouri
USL Championship players
Soccer players from Arkansas
Sportspeople from Fort Smith, Arkansas